The Grampians are a mountain range in Scotland.

Grampian or Grampians may also refer to:

In Scotland:
Grampian, a former local government region of Scotland
Grampian Television (now STV North), the ITV licensee for Northern Scotland

In Australia:
Grampians (region), an administrative economic region in Victoria, Australia
Grampians National Park, a national park in Victoria, Australia
Grampians (wine), a wine region near the national park in Victoria, Australia

In Canada:
Grampian Marine Limited, a Canadian boat builder

In New Zealand:
The Grampians (New Zealand), a range of hills in Nelson, New Zealand

In the United States of America:
Grampian, Pennsylvania, a borough in Pennsylvania

Ships
 ship built 1907. Sold for scrap in 1925.

See also
Grampian phase, part of the Caledonian orogeny mountain building era